Petiveriaceae is a family of flowering plants formerly included as subfamily Rivinoideae in Phytolaccaceae. The family comprises nine genera, with about 20 known species.

Genera 
Petiveriaceae includes the following genera:

References

External links

 Phytolaccaceae in L. Watson and M.J. Dallwitz (1992 onwards). The families of flowering plants: descriptions, illustrations, identification, information retrieval. Version: 30 May 2006. http://delta-intkey.com

 
Caryophyllales families
Taxa named by Carl Adolph Agardh